Sweet Life may refer to:

 Sweet Life (album), a 1999 album by Renée Geyer
 "Sweet Life" (Paul Davis song), a 1978 song by Paul Davis
 "Sweet Life" (Frank Ocean song), a 2012 song by Frank Ocean
 "Sweet Life (La vie est belle)", a 2013 song by Fally Ipupa
 Sweet Life: Los Angeles, a 2021 HBO Max reality TV series, created by Issa Rae
 "Sweet Life", a song by Barry Manilow from the 1973 album Barry Manilow, first recorded in 1972 by Punch
 "Sweet Life", a song by Jeezy from the 2015 album Church in These Streets

See also
 The Sweet Life (disambiguation)